Ehud Avriel (born Georg Überall, 1917 – 27 August 1980) was an Israeli diplomat and politician who served as a member of the Knesset for Mapai between 1955 and 1957.

Biography
Born in Vienna in Austria-Hungary, Avriel was educated at a local gymnasium. He was a member of the Blue-White movement, and between 1938 and 1940 worked for the Youth Aliyah office in occupied Vienna.

He immigrated to Mandatory Palestine in 1940 and settled in kibbutz Neot Mordechai. He joined the Haganah, and was involved in the Rescue Committee assisting Jews flee Europe. He spent some years in Turkey as well for that purpose. After the war ended he helped illegal Jewish immigration to Palestine. In 1946, he was sent to Czechoslovakia to purchase arms for the Jewish community. On 28 July 1948 he became envoy to Czechoslovakia and Hungary. Together with Israeli tycoon Efraim Ilin, Avriel negotiated an arms deal with Czechoslovakia. Two years later he was moved to Romania where he remained, as head of the legation, until late March 1951, returning to Israel in April.

In 1955, he was elected to the Knesset on the Mapai list. However, he resigned on 31 July 1957, and was appointed ambassador to Ghana, Liberia and Congo, a position he held until 1960. Between 1961 and 1965, he served as deputy director general of the Ministry of Foreign Affairs, before serving as ambassador to Italy between 1965 and 1968. From 1966 until 1968, while based in Rome, he was also ambassador to Malta. He later worked as a consul general in Chicago in 1974, and an ambassador for Special Affairs between 1977 and 1979.

He died in 1980.

References

External links

1917 births
1980 deaths
Jewish emigrants from Austria to Mandatory Palestine after the Anschluss
Diplomats from Vienna
Haganah members
Israeli civil servants
Members of the 3rd Knesset (1955–1959)
Ambassadors of Israel to the Republic of the Congo
Ambassadors of Israel to Ghana
Ambassadors of Israel to Liberia
Ambassadors of Israel to Italy
Mapai politicians
Ambassadors of Israel to Romania
Ambassadors of Israel to Czechoslovakia
Ambassadors of Israel to Hungary
Ambassadors of Israel to Malta